The Optical Gravitational Lensing Experiment (OGLE) is a Polish astronomical project based at the University of Warsaw that runs a long-term variability sky survey (1992–present). The main goals are the detection and classification of variable stars (pulsating and eclipsing), discovery of microlensing events, dwarf novae, and studies of the structure of the Galaxy and the Magellanic Clouds. Since the project began in 1992, it has discovered a multitude of extrasolar planets, together with the first planet discovered using the transit method (OGLE-TR-56b) and gravitational microlensing. The project has been led by professor Andrzej Udalski since its inception.

Description 

The main targets of the experiment are the Magellanic Clouds and the Galactic Bulge, because of the large number of intervening stars that can be used for microlensing during a stellar transit. Most of the observations have been made at the Las Campanas Observatory in Chile. Cooperating institutions include Princeton University and the Carnegie Institution.

The project is now in its fourth phase. The first phase, OGLE-I (1992–1995) used the  Swope telescope and a single-chip CCD sensor. For OGLE-II (1996–2000), a  telescope dedicated to the project (the Warsaw telescope) was constructed at Las Campanas Observatory. It was equipped with a single 2048×2048 pixel sensor with a field of view 0.237 degrees wide.

OGLE-III (2001–2009) expanded the camera to a mosaic of eight 2048×4096 pixel CCDs, and was able to search for gravitational microlensing events and transiting planets in four fields: the Galactic Bulge, the constellation Carina, and toward both Magellanic Clouds. As a byproduct of the constant monitoring of hundreds of millions of stars, the largest catalogs of variable stars were constructed, and the first exoplanets discovered using the microlensing technique were detected.

In 2010, following engineering work in 2009, the fourth and current phase, OGLE-IV, was started using a 32-chip mosaic CCD camera which fills the Warsaw telescope's 1.5° field of view. The main goal for this phase is to increase the number of planetary detections using microlensing, enabled by the new camera.

Recently the OGLE team, in cooperation with scientists mostly from the US, New Zealand and Japan, proved that small, Earth-like planets can exist at a significant distance from stars around which they revolve despite there being other stars near them.

In January 2022 in collaboration with Microlensing Observations in Astrophysics (MOA) they reported in a preprint the first rogue BH

while there have been others candidates this is the most solid detection so far as their technique allowed to measure not only the amplification of light but also its deflection by the BH from the microlensing data.

Planets discovered 

At least seventeen planets have so far been discovered by the OGLE project. Eight of the planets were discovered by the transit method and six by the gravitational microlensing method.

Planets are shown in the order of discovery. Planets in multiple-planet systems are highlighted in yellow. The list below may not be complete.

Notes: For events detected by the gravitational microlensing method, year stands for OGLE season, BLG means that an event detected is in the Galactic BuLGe, and the following 3-digit number is an ordinal number of microlensing event in that season. For events detected by the transit method TR stands for TRansit and the following 3-digit number is an ordinal number of transit event.

See also 

 Variable stars
 Cepheids
 All Sky Automated Survey
 Bohdan Paczyński
 Andrzej Udalski
 Grzegorz Pojmański
 List of planetary systems
 Microlensing Observations in Astrophysics (MOA)

References

External links 
 OGLE Homepage in Warsaw, Poland
 OGLE-IV sky coverage maps
 Detailed OGLE-IV fields diagrams

Astronomical surveys
Experiments for dark matter search
Gravitational lensing
Telescopes
Exoplanet search projects
Astronomy projects